Silkroad, formerly the Silk Road Project, Inc., is a not-for-profit organization, initiated by the cellist Yo-Yo Ma in 1998, promoting collaboration among artists and institutions, promoting multicultural artistic exchange, and studying the ebb and flow of ideas. The project was first inspired by the cultural traditions of the historical Eurasian Silk Road trade routes and now encompasses a number of artistic, cultural and educational programs focused on connecting people and ideas from around the world. It has been described as an "arts and educational organization that connects musicians, composers, artists and audiences around the world" and "an initiative to promote multicultural artistic collaboration."

In July 2020, Rhiannon Giddens took over from Yo-Yo Ma as Artistic Director.

Recent events
In 2009, Silkroad began an educational pilot program for middle-school students in New York City public schools. The program, called Silk Road Connect, focuses on passion-driven education through arts integration and is being developed with help from education experts at the Harvard Graduate School of Education. In July 2012, Silkroad and Harvard Graduate School of Education presented "The Arts and Passion-Driven Learning," an arts education institute that modeled the Silk Road Connect arts integration approach.<ref>[http://news.harvard.edu/gazette/story/2012/08/inspiring-as-well-as-educating/ Inspiring as well as educating: Musicians, Ed School leaders probe teaching methods that turn 'have to' into 'want to'] — Harvard Gazette, August 3, 2012.</ref> The program has continued each year since.

In celebration of its 10th anniversary, Silkroad presented performances and programs by the Silk Road Ensemble in North America, Asia and Europe from 2008 to 2010. Its anniversary season began with the Silk Road Ensemble's performance with Yo-Yo Ma of the United Nations Day Concert in October 2008. Tenth-anniversary activities also included a North American concert tour by the Silk Road Ensemble with Yo-Yo Ma in March 2009, which featured the North American premiere of Layla and Majnun, a chamber arrangement for the Silk Road Ensemble of a traditional Azerbaijani opera.

The organization has published a book, Along the Silk Road, and commissioned more than 70 new chamber music compositions. Silkroad has also created educational materials entitled "Silk Road Encounters" and has partnered with the Stanford Program on International and Cross-Cultural Education (SPICE) to produce Along the Silk Road, a curriculum for students in grades six-10,<ref>New Curriculum Brings Cultural Exchange to Chicago Classrooms]  — Silk Road Project Newsletter, Summer 2007.</ref> and The Road to Beijing, a documentary made available with related lessons about Beijing in advance of the 2008 Summer Olympic Games.

Partnerships
Silkroad is affiliated with Harvard University; the organization moved its offices to the Harvard campus in Boston, Massachusetts, in July 2010 at the outset of a renewed five-year affiliation with the University, designed to enable new artistic and cultural opportunities at Harvard and in surrounding communities. Silkroad has been affiliated with both Harvard University and the Rhode Island School of Design in the USA, where the Silk Road Ensemble engaged with faculty and students in annual residencies. Silkroad's partnership with Rhode Island School of Design took place from 2005 through 2010. As part of Silkroad programming, the Silk Road Ensemble has also been involved in short-term residencies at Museum Rietberg in Zurich, Switzerland; The Art Institute of Chicago; University of California, Santa Barbara; Rubin Museum of Art in New York City; Nara National Museum in Nara, Japan; the Peabody Essex Museum in Salem, Massachusetts; and the Aga Khan Museum in Toronto.

The Music of StrangersThe Music of Strangers: Yo-Yo Ma and the Silk Road Ensemble is a documentary film about Silkroad directed by Morgan Neville, who also produced with Caitrin Rogers. The film was released in U.S. theaters starting in June 2016. The Orchard has acquired all worldwide rights to the film with the exception of U.S. domestic television rights, which HBO has acquired. Reviews of the documentary included: Rotten Tomatoes 85%; Washington Post 3/4; and, 7/10 IMDb.

The Silk Road Ensemble

The Silk Road Ensemble is a musical collective and a part of Silkroad. The ensemble is not a fixed group of musicians, but rather a loose collective of as many as 59 musicians, composers, arrangers, visual artists and storytellers from Eurasian cultures.

The Ensemble has regularly commissioned new works from across a broad musical spectrum, including works by Zhao Jiping and Dmitri Yanov-Yanovsky, and is known for its series of interdisciplinary festivals and residencies presented in North America, Europe, and Asia. They have performed in many locations along the historic Silk Road, including Iran, Armenia, Azerbaijan, Kazakhstan, India, the Kyrgyz Republic and Tajikistan.

The Ensemble uses various instruments from the Silk Road region, including a pipa, a Chinese short-necked plucked lute; a duduk, an Armenian double reed woodwind; a Shakuhachi, a Japanese bamboo flute; and a morin khuur, a Mongolian horse head fiddle; among many others.

Discography
The Silk Road Ensemble has recorded eight CDs. The group's 2009 CD Off the Map was nominated in the Best Classical Crossover Album category at the 53rd Grammy Awards in 2011.

 2001 - Silk Road Journey: When Strangers Meet 2005 - Silk Road Journeys: Beyond the Horizon (released earlier in Japan in 2004 titled Enchantment)
 2007 - New Impossibilities 2008 - Traditions and Transformations: Sounds of Silk Road Chicago 2009 - Off the Map 2013 - A Playlist Without Borders 2016 - Sing Me Home 2017 - The Vietnam War: A Film By Ken Burns & Lynn Novick [soundtrack
 2020 - Falling Out of Time

Members
In addition to Ma, performing members of the ensemble include:

Siamak Aghaei - santur/composer
Edward Arron - cello
Kinan Azmeh - clarinet
Jeffrey Beecher - double bass
Mike Block - cello
Nicholas Cords - viola
Gevorg Dabaghyan - duduk
Sandeep Das - tabla/composer
Joel Fan - piano
Haruka Fujii - percussion
Jonathan Gandelsman - violin
Joseph Gramley - percussion/composer
Ben Haggarty - storyteller
He Cui - sheng
Hu Jianbing - sheng, bawu
Rauf Islamov - kamancheh
Colin Jacobsen - violin/composer
Siamak Jahangiry - ney
Kayhan Kalhor - kamancheh/composer
Ganbaatar Khongorzul - urtiin duu (long song)
Dong-Won Kim - janggo, vocals/composer
Ji Hyun Kim - kayagum, vocals
You-Young Kim - viola
Li Hui - pipa
Liu Lin - sanxian
Ali Asgar Mammadov - tar
Max Mandel - viola
Gulia Mashurova - harp
Kevork Mourad - visual artist
Cristina Pato - Galician bagpipe /composer
Alim Qasimov - mugham vocals
Farghana Qasimova - mugham vocals
Bassam Saba - oud, ney/composer
Shane Shanahan - percussion/composer
Mark Suter - percussion/composer
Kojiro Umezaki - shakuhachi/composer
Wu Man - pipa
Wu Tong - sheng, bawu/composer
Betti Xiang - erhu
Yang Wei - pipa
DaXun Zhang - double bass
Reylon Yount - yangqin
Jason Duckles - Cello

Silk Road Ensemble composers and arrangers include:

Rabih Abou-Khalil
Christopher Adler
Franghiz Ali-Zadeh
Jia Daqun
Gabriela Lena Frank
Osvaldo Golijov
Jeeyoung Kim
Glenn Kotche
Angel Lam
Alisher Latif-Zadeh
Ljova (Lev Zhurbin)
Nurlanbek Nyshanov
Sangidorjiin Sansargereltekh
Vache Sharafyan
Byambasuren Sharav
Giovanni Sollima
Dmitri Yanov-Yanovsky
Zhao Jiping
Zhao Lin
Evan Ziporyn

Silk Road Chicago
Silk Road Chicago was a yearlong, citywide celebration, from June 2006 to June 2007, with special events, performances, and exhibitions that explored cross-cultural discovery and celebrated the artistic legacy of the historic Silk Road. Silk Road Chicago was a partnership among Silkroad, the Chicago Department of Cultural Affairs and the Chicago Office of Tourism, Chicago Symphony Orchestra, and The Art Institute of Chicago.

References

External links
Silkroad
Instruments from the Silk Road
Artists associated with the Silk Road Ensemble
Silk Road Chicago
Article from The World & I about Yo-Yo Ma's Silk Road Project
Interview with Yo-Yo Ma about the  Silk Road Project - Weekend America

Musical groups established in 1998
Musical collectives
Chamber music groups
Grammy Award winners